Alle maten (All Sizes) was a 1998 Belgian comedy TV series directed by Rik Daniëls and Vincent Rouffaer written by Frans Ceusters and Paul Coppens.

The series had appearances from actors such as Bob Van der Veken who played the character of Aanbidder and Hans de Munter

External links

Flemish television shows
Belgian comedy television shows
1998 Belgian television series debuts
1990s Belgian television series